The European and African Zone is one of the three zones of regional Davis Cup competition in 2010.

In the European and African Zone there are four different groups in which teams compete against each other to advance to the next group.

Participating teams

Seeds

Other Nations

Draw

 and  relegated to Group II in 2011.

First Round Matches

Italy vs. Belarus

Poland vs. Finland

Ukraine vs. Latvia

Second Round Matches

Austria vs. Slovakia

Netherlands vs. Italy

Finland vs. South Africa

Ukraine vs. Romania

First-round play-offs

Netherlands vs. Belarus

Second-round play-offs

Slovakia vs. Belarus

Poland vs. Latvia

References

Europe Africa Zone Group I
Davis Cup Europe/Africa Zone